Emiliano Rodolfo Rosales-Birou (born April 8, 1990), also known as Emile Rosales and better known by his online alias Chuggaaconroy, is an American YouTuber, Internet personality and Let's Player. He is most notable for his comprehensive walkthrough videos on various video games released on Nintendo platforms, including titles from the EarthBound, Super Mario, The Legend of Zelda, Pikmin, Pokémon and Xenoblade Chronicles series. 

Alongside his Let's Play videos, Rosales-Birou is a founding member of The Runaway Guys collaborative Let's Play YouTube channel with fellow Let's Play personalities Jonathan "Proton Jon" Wheeler and Timothy "NintendoCapriSun" Bishop, where they have played various multiplayer video games including Mario Party and New Super Mario Bros.

Personal life 
Rosales-Birou was born on April 8, 1990, and is a native of Phoenix, Arizona. , he resides in Atlanta, Georgia. Rosales-Birou had been a member of the EarthBound video game community fan-site Starmen.net as a teenager, where he met fellow content creator and collaborator Stephen Georg; Georg had mentioned how Rosales-Birou had introduced him to the Let's Play genre and inspired him to make his own gaming channel.

YouTube career

History (2008–present) 
Rosales-Birou created his YouTube account on July 26, 2006, under the alias of "Chuggaaconroy," a name he has used as an online pseudonym since he was a child. He was initially inspired to make Let's Plays by personalities such as Jonathan "Proton Jon" Wheeler, a Let's Player originating from the Something Awful forums and a future founding member of The Runaway Guys. On March 26, 2008, he uploaded his first Let's Play series covering the SNES role-playing game EarthBound on YouTube, adding commentary on the game's sound and art design. He would later upload Let's Play videos on the other games in the Mother series.

In July 2010, Rosales-Birou's YouTube account was suspended under false copyright claims, though was restored in August. Shortly after the incident, he obtained a YouTube partnership with The Game Station (now called Polaris), a sub-network of Maker Studios. Rosales-Birou's channel grew in popularity as his gameplay videos were often recommended on YouTube's suggestions, and he has since become a Let's Play creator on YouTube as a full-time job; in 2014 The Atlantic cited Rosales-Birou as an example of a Let's Player making a living off of gaming videos. Nintendo had initially targeted and content ID-claimed several of Rosales-Birou's videos due to them containing footage of their games, causing his ad revenue to temporarily decrease, but later ceased doing so.

On his primary YouTube channel, Rosales-Birou has produced over 40 solo Let's Play series of games primarily exclusive to Nintendo systems, such as EarthBound, Paper Mario: The Thousand-Year Door, Pikmin, Super Luigi Galaxy, The Legend of Zelda: Majora's Mask, Pokémon Emerald, Super Paper Mario, Super Mario 64 DS, Animal Crossing: New Leaf, Xenoblade Chronicles, and Splatoon.

In 2018, Rosales-Birou remade his EarthBound Let's Play series on the tenth anniversary of his YouTube channel's formation, going into detail on previously undiscussed trivia and knowledge surrounding the game. He had previously expressed interest in remaking the series, feeling that he "could have done such a better job now." However, in June 2021, several of Rosales-Birou's EarthBound videos were content ID-claimed and subsequently blocked worldwide by Sony, due to the company owning the distribution rights to the soundtrack of the Mother series.

In 2021, Rosales-Birou's Let's Play series on Xenoblade Chronicles 2 coincided with the announcement of characters Pyra and Mythra as DLC fighters in Super Smash Bros. Ultimate, marking the second time a Xenoblade character was announced for Super Smash Bros. during his concurrent Let's Play videos on the series.

Commentary and video style 
Rosales-Birou's gaming videos have been categorized under the walkthrough genre, and have been described as both entertaining and informative. Contrasting from other Let's Play channels, his content focuses on footage from Nintendo games several years after their initial release dates, mainly of titles he has played numerous times before. During his gameplay videos, Rosales-Birou attempts to show every aspect of each individual game he plays to 100% completion, including every item, boss battle, sidequest, and Easter egg possible. Rosales-Birou commentates in an informative manner in his videos with the purpose of guiding viewers to complete the game themselves. For example, in his Pokémon Emerald series he discusses various strategies and viable techniques to ensure optimal success in the game, and in his second EarthBound series he showcased a particular glitch in the game involving the Tent located in Threed, one of the cities featured in the game. In this regard, his gameplay videos function as informative walkthroughs with the premise of guiding players through each aspect of the specific game he plays; Ryan Rigney from Wired magazine noted that Rosales-Birou "possesses a near encyclopedic knowledge about the games he's playing, and reliably dispenses gobs of obscure information as he plays."

In spite of their informative nature, Rosales-Birou's videos often employ humorous moments in his gameplay, such as the occasional failure or death in a level and subsequent backtracking. His videos have also been described as nostalgic and reflective, as he often tells personal anecdotes of his experiences with the games he plays.

The Runaway Guys 

The Runaway Guys is a collaborative Let's Play channel formed by Rosales-Birou, Jonathan Wheeler (Proton Jon) and Timothy Bishop (NintendoCapriSun). The group records themselves playing various multiplayer video games such as Mario Party, New Super Mario Bros. Wii, Kirby & the Amazing Mirror and Wheel of Fortune.

In addition to their videos, The Runaway Guys have also created the "Thrown Controllers" event, a live game show which focuses on video game trivia and challenges. The event has been broadcast on numerous gaming conventions such as PAX, Magfest and Momocon.

The group has also done gaming live-streams for charity, hosting "The Runaway Guys Colosseum" stream for the non-profit organization Direct Relief. Guests who have collaborated with the group on the stream include YouTube personalities Tom Fawkes, MasaeAnela, JoshJepson and FamilyJules.

Other works 
In 2014, Rosales-Birou appeared in an episode of Did You Know Gaming? to explain trivia on the EarthBound franchise. He had also collaborated with YouTuber TheJWittz in a video discussing theories on the Pokémon character Giovanni from Team Rocket.

In 2012, he appeared in an episode of The Game Station Podcast hosted by British YouTube gamer TotalBiscuit.

In June 2022, Rosales-Birou attended the Games Done Quick event Summer Games Done Quick and served as a couch commentator for a speedrun of Xenoblade Chronicles 2: Torna – The Golden Country by notable speed-runner Enel.

Reputation 
Rosales-Birou's Let's Play videos have been received positively. Jennifer O'Connell from The Irish Times noted Rosales-Birou's content as a family-friendly alternative to more vulgar YouTube gaming channels, and Noel Murray from The New York Times cited him as an example of a YouTuber "less interested in personal branding than in sharing their (his) enthusiasm." Stephen Adegun of Reporter had given his content praise for its informative nature, stating that "while watching one of his series of playthroughs, viewers can doubtlessly come away having learned something new about the game, even if they knew a lot about it already." He has also appeared in various lists of the best gaming YouTube channels. 

Rosales-Birou's YouTube channel name was featured as a cheat code for the 2019 Metroidvania game Bloodstained: Ritual of the Night, alongside other prominent internet personalities. In 2020, his Super Mario Sunshine series was listed as one of the top ten memes of the game following the release of Super Mario 3D All-Stars.

Rosales-Birou's YouTube channel reached 1 million subscribers and 760 million views in 2015, and is at over 1.2 million subscribers and 1.1 billion views as of 2022.

See also 
EarthBound fandom
List of YouTubers
Let's Play

Notes

References

External links

Living people
1990 births
Let's Players
Video game commentators
Polaris channels
Maker Studios people
American YouTubers
Gaming YouTubers
YouTube channels launched in 2006
American people of Mexican descent
American people of French descent
People from Arizona
Charity fundraisers (people)